Baja California Sur ('South Lower California'), officially the Free and Sovereign State of Baja California Sur, is the least populated state and the 31st admitted state of the 32 federal entities which comprise the 31 States of Mexico. It is also the ninth-largest Mexican state in terms of area.

Before becoming a state on 8 October 1974, the area was known as the El Territorio Sur de Baja California ("South Territory of Lower California"). It is bordered to the north by the state of Baja California, to the west by the Pacific Ocean, and to the east by the Gulf of California. The state has maritime borders with Sonora and Sinaloa to the east, across the Gulf of California.

The state is home to the tourist resorts of Cabo San Lucas and San José del Cabo. Its largest city and capital is La Paz.

Etymology

The state is named after the peninsula on which it is found, Baja (Lower) California, with the term "Sur" meaning "south". The name California applied to this peninsula along with the area now known as the state of California in the United States. The coat of arms emphasizes the state's connection to the sea, including images of silver fish, a silver shell and a blue background.

History

Pre-Columbian era

Japanese archaeologist Harumi Fujita, who has been excavating the Cape Region since 1985, has carbon-dated remains from the Babisuri Shelter on the Isla Espíritu Santo to 40,000 years ago, placing the earliest habitation date in the Archaic period, though the majority of remains indicate indigenous people have constantly occupied the area from between 10,000 and 21,000 years ago. Evidence of early human habitation is found in primitive rock and cave paintings dating to 1700 BCE, created by hunting and gathering societies that lived in rock shelters. The state is one of five areas in the world with important concentrations of cave paintings. These paintings have an identifiable style and tend to be on a monumental scale with some figures as tall as four meters. Most of the animals are painted in silhouette and depicted in movement, often being hunted by people. The best known site is the Great Mural Rock Art which dates from 1700 BCE, located in the north of the state. Other important sites include Cueva de Palma, San Gregorio, Santa Teresa, Guadalupe, San Francisco, Cabo Pulmo, Santiago and San Borjita. The most important concentrations are in twelve square kilometer zone in the north of the state, centered on the Sierra de San Francisco. In sites near Comondú, Las Palmas and Cocheros, there are also arrowheads, utensils and petroglyphs. Las Palmas contains secondary burials of human bones painted with red ochre.

When the Spanish arrived, there were four main ethnic groups: the Pericúes in the south between Cabo San Lucas and La Paz, the Guaycuras in the area north of the Pericú to Loreto, the Monquis near Loreto and Cochimí in the middle of the peninsula. All were hunter/gatherers without agriculture or metalworking, but produced pottery. They also fished, but only the Pericúes had rafts.

Colonial era

 
The first Spaniard in the area is believed to be Fortún Ximénez, arriving in 1533. He and his crew did not remain long because they sacked the area's pearls and abused the women, prompting a violent confrontation with the natives, who killed Ximénez. The remaining crew returned to Mexico City with the pearls and stories of riches.

In 1535, Hernán Cortés navigated into the Gulf of California, which he called the Sea of Cortés. He landed in what is now the bay of La Paz, which he named the Santa Cruz Port and Valley. This event is celebrated in La Paz as its founding. However, he did not remain.

Despite various explorations, the remoteness of the region impeded efforts at colonization until the 17th century. In 1697, Jesuit missionary Juan María de Salvatierra established the Nuestra Señora de Loreto Conchó Mission, the first permanent one of its kind in Baja California Sur. From there the order spread through most of the current state, founding sixteen missions in territory of the current state to work among the Pericú, Guaycura and Cochimí peoples.

During the 18th century, more colonists arrived, bringing diseases that caused a significant decrease in the indigenous population.

In 1768, the Jesuits were expelled from New Spain and the Franciscans took over the missions, continuing the expansion north. In 1773 they were replaced by the Dominicans. A number of these mission churches still survive, including the Loreto Mission, the La Paz Cathedral, the San José del Cabo Mission and the San Javier Mission.

19th century

The missions' influence had waned by the start of the nineteenth century, with most closing. However, many of the mission facilities became the centers for ranching operations and some agriculture. Without the protection of the monks, and the lack of governmental control, the indigenous peoples of this time were abused by the ranchers.

In the early 19th century, Baja California was divided into four municipalities, Loreto, San José del Cabo, San Pedro Mártir and Santa Gertrudis.

The southern peninsula's isolation kept it out of the fighting during the Mexican War of Independence. Although this war ended in 1821, the remoteness of the area allowed the Spanish to maintain control of the southern peninsula until 1822. Afterwards, it was divided into four municipalities by Guadalupe Victoria and governor José María Echendía.

Loreto was the original capital of the peninsula until 1830, when destruction of the town by heavy rains forced the government's relocation to La Paz, which has been the capital since.

The United States invaded the peninsula during the Mexican–American War and wanted it as part of the Treaty of Guadalupe Hidalgo, but the Mexican government succeeded in keeping control of the territory. In 1853, William Walker and 45 other Americans captured La Paz. However, due to lack of official U.S. support they were quickly driven out by Mexican forces.

During the Reform War, Liberal forces under General Manuel Marquez de Leon and others captured La Paz. French forces then invaded the country to support the Conservative cause, and Governor Felix Gilbert recognized Emperor Maximilian. However, Mexican forces under Benito Juarez forced the French out, with Coronel Clodomiro Cota, recapturing the peninsula from the French.

The division of the peninsula into north and south occurred in 1888 by the federal government under Porfirio Diaz.

20th century to present
During the regime of Porfirio Diaz (1876 to 1910), the Mexican government invited foreign enterprises to enter the country to develop it. In Baja California, these included mining operations including a major French mine called El Boleo (near Santa Rosalia) and the establishment of maritime routes. This president also divided the peninsula into two parts, each with its own government.

The southern peninsula was not involved in the Mexican Revolution until after the assassination of Francisco I. Madero, when troops were organized in opposition to Victoriano Huerta, his successor under Félix Ortega. These troops defeated federal troops in 1914 and took over La Paz.

From the end of the Mexican Revolution to 1974, the territory had ten governors appointed by the federal government. The division of the peninsula was further formalized in 1931, with a highway extending its length the same year. Infrastructure development remained a priority for the area, with the establishment of schools including the first teachers’ college in 1942, and projects to provide water and electricity.

The southern territory became a state on 8 October 1974, with three municipalities: La Paz, Comondú and Mulegé. Two others have been carved out since then, Los Cabos (1981) and Loreto (1992).

Geography

The state is on a narrow peninsula which broke away from the mainland about two million years ago due to tectonic activity. The territory is primarily mountains or mountain ranges and coastal plains. The mountain ranges parallel the coastline and are of volcanic rock. The local name for the main mountain range is the Sierra de la Giganta and the highest peak is the Sierra de la Laguna at 2080m above sea level. The coastal plains are significantly wider on the Pacific side, averaging about 40 km, with much wider plains such as those of Santa Clara, Berrendo and Magdalena y Hiray. These areas are dominated by sedimentary rock, especially limestone of marine origin.

The state is divided into five regions: Central Desert, La Serranía, the Vizcaíno Desert, the Magdalena Plains and Los Cabos. The Central Desert has desert plants, with vegetation springing up during short and irregular rains. The La Serranía is the high mountain areas with significant tree cover, some species of which are commercially valuable. The Vizcaíno Desert runs along the Pacific coast around the Ojo de Liebre and San Ignacio lagoons; it contains lower mountain ranges such as the San Francisco, San Alberto, Las Tinajas de Murillo and El Serrucho, along with the El Azufre and Las Vírgenes volcanos. The Magdalena Plains is a large, flat area near the Pacific coast, and the Los Cabos region is distinguished by microclimates determined by the geologic change in the area and rain patterns.

The climate of the state is dry, with an average annual temperature of 18–22 °C and average annual rainfall of less than 200mm. The lower elevations are the driest and hottest, with summer daytime temperatures above 40 °C; wintertime temperatures may fall below freezing. The exception to desert conditions is the Los Cabos region, classified as semi-moist because of Pacific hurricane activity which affects the region. In the spring, prevailing winds are from the west and in the summer from the south and southwest. In the fall, they are from the northwest and in the winter from the north and northwest.

Most of the surface water is in the form of seasonal streams, which are fast-flowing and only active during stormy weather. Most of these drain into the Pacific Ocean, with a number flowing south into the Bahía de Ballenas.

The main geological feature of the state is its coastline which measures 2230 km, making it Mexico's longest with 22% of the total. It also has the most islands, mostly in the Gulf of California. There are three in the Pacific, Natividad, Magdalena and Santa Margarita (the largest). In the Gulf of California, they include San Marcos, Coronados, Carmen, Montserrat, Santa Catalina, Santa Cruz, San Diego, San Jose, San Francisco, Partida, Espiritu Santo and Cerralvo. Major bays include Sebastian Vizcaino, Magdalena, La Paz, Asunción, Ballenas, Concepcion and San Carlos. Estuaries and lagoons including those at Puerto Escondido, Nopoló, Blandra as well as the San José estuary at Cabo Colorado, the San Ignacio Lagoon and the Ojo de Liebre.

The ecological system here is considered to be recently evolved with a number of endemic species. The lower elevations are dominated by desert and arid condition plants. This includes the world's largest species of cactus, the cardón cactus, which can reach heights of 15m. Other plant species include mesquite, chironola, lechuguilla, nopal and barrel cactus, choyas, paloadan and pitahaya. The higher elevations have forests of pine and holm oak with some deciduous forests, with leaves falling in the dry season, generally no taller than fifteen meters. Wildlife in the desert areas is restricted to birds, reptiles and small to medium mammals such as rabbits and coyotes. Upper elevations with more vegetation can have wild sheep, pumas and other wild cats, raccoons, deer, and foxes. Marine species include whales, seals, dolphins, gray whales, manta rays and sea turtles.

Baja California Sur has the largest protected surface area in Mexico, 38.3 % of the state in 10 official protected areas: Bahía de Loreto National Park (510,472.2 acres), Cabo Pulmo National Park (17'570 acres), Espíritu Santo Archipelago National Park (120,228.70 acres), El Vizcaíno Biosphere Reserve (6,293,255.76 acres), Ojo de Liebre Lagoon Bioshere Reserve (196,026.15 acres), Sierra de la Laguna Biosphere Reserve (277,838.05 acres), Balandra Protection Area of Flora and Fauna (6,209.09 acres) and Cabo San Lucas Protection Area of Flora and Fauna (9,874.42 acres). Also, the islands located in Baja California Sur coastline on the Pacific Ocean and the Gulf of California are protected under Pacific Islands of the Baja California Peninsula Biosphere Reserve with Baja California, and Islands of the Gulf of California Protection Area of Flora and Fauna, which shares with the states of Baja California, Sinaloa and Sonora.

Demographics
About ethnicity, 59% are mestizos, 40% are whites, and 1% are indigenous. As of 2010, 86% of the population lived in urban areas. According to the 2020 Census, 3.3% of Baja California Sur's population identified as Black, Afro-Mexican, or of African descent.

Largest cities

The average years of schooling for those over 15 years of age is 9.6, above the national average of 8.9. It has a low illiteracy rate of 3%, lower than that of the country (6.1%).
Institutions of higher education include:
Autonomous University of Baja California Sur (Universidad Autonoma de Baja California Sur, UABCS)
Instituto Tecnologico de La Paz (ITLP)
Centro de investigaciones biologicas del noroeste (CIBNOR)
Centro Interdiciplinario de Ciencias Marinas (CICIMAR)
Universidad Pedagógica Nacional (UPN)
Universidad Internacional de la Paz (UNIPAZ)
Instituto Tecnológico de Estudios Superiores de Los Cabos (ITES)
Instituto Tecnológico Superior de Ciudad Constitución (ITSCC)
Instituto Tecnológico Superior de Mulegé (ITESME)

Political divisions

The state is the southern part of the Baja California Peninsula, located in the northwest of Mexico, part of the larger The Californias region of North America. With a territory of 73,909 km2, it is about 750 km long and averages about 100 km wide.

The state is divided into five municipalities. Comondú is located in the center of the state with its seat at Ciudad Constitución. It borders the municipalities of Mulegé, Loreto and La Paz with the Pacific Ocean to the west. Mulegé is in the north of the state with its capital in Santa Rosalía, with two other important population centers at Guerrero Negro and Mulegé. It borders the municipalities of Comondú and Loreto with Baja California to the north, the Pacific Ocean to the west and the Gulf of California to the east. It accounts for almost 45% of the state's territory. The municipality of La Paz is in the south of the state. It is the second largest municipality, accounting for just over 27% of the territory of the state. It borders the municipalities of Comondú and Los Cabos and extends from the Pacific Ocean to the Gulf of California. The municipality of Los Cabos is at the southern tip of the state, with its seat at San José del Cabo, and its most populous city is Cabo San Lucas. The municipality is one of the most important tourist destinations in Mexico. The municipality borders that of La Paz to the north, with the rest defined by the Pacific Ocean and the Gulf of California. The municipality of Loreto is in the center of the state, with the city of Loreto as its seat. It borders the municipalities of Mulegé and Comondú with the Gulf of California to the east.

Economy

Traditionally based mostly on tourism, sport fishing, salt production, and mining, in 2012 the GDP of the state accounted for only 0.73% of the country's GDP, but grew 3.13% in comparison to the year prior. In 2013, this growth increased to 7.8%. Unemployment in 2013 was 5.1% with employment shifting away from agriculture and fishing to mining and industry (up 19.9%) and commerce (up 4.9%). Today, agriculture, fishing and forestry account for only 3.89% of the state GDP. Commercial species include tuna, sardines, anchovies, clams, snails, oysters, shark, lobsters, abalone, shrimp, and crabs, which are sold both nationally and internationally. Commercial fishing harvests lobster, shrimp, tuna, abalone, and clams. Major crops include garbanzo beans, sorghum, tomatoes, alfalfa, wheat, corn and green chili peppers. Livestock includes pigs, cattle, goats and chickens.

Mining, construction and utilities account for 26.61%. Mining includes plaster (mainly on San Marcos Island), limestone (in Todos los Santos), phosphorus (in San Juan de La Costa and Adolfo LópezMateos, Comondú), copper (in Santa Rosalía), gold and silver (in the Triunfo-San Antonio mine), manganese (in Santa Rosalia and Punta Concepción Bay) and chrome (in San SebastiánVizcaíno and Magdalena bays). There are other minerals not yet routinely mined such as titanium, tungsten, and cobalt. There is some possibility of offshore hydrocarbons. The state also produces salt of 99.7% purity, mostly in the area around Guerrero Negro. There are two major industrial/technology parks: Parque Tecnológico BioHelis and Parque Industrial La Paz Sur. Traditional handcrafts can be found throughout the state and include articles made with seashells, palo chino, choya and cardon cactus. Baskets and other items are woven from palm fronds especially in el Triunfo Los Planes and the Sierra de los Dolores as well as fishing nets. Another important craft is leatherwork, especially the making of gear for horseback riding such as saddles, holsters and chaps along with belts and carrying bags. In addition, scrap metal is converted into various types of knives.

Commerce and services account for 69.5% of the GDP. La Paz was ranked 31st in Mexico by the World Bank and the International Finance Corporation in ease of doing business and 23rd as a place to open a business. Major activities of this type include hotel and food service (16.43%) and housing sales and rentals (10.67%), which along with other activities (17.65%) account for 58.37% of the total GDP.

The most dynamic aspect of the economy is tourism, with a number of natural resources which are apt for this purpose, such as the grey whales that come to the area to breed and the natural rock arch at Land's End is frequently photographed. Tourist attractions are divided into three regions: north (Guerrero Negro to Ciudad Constitución), center (La Paz to Todos Santos), and south (Los Barriles to Cabo San Lucas). There are two main resort areas, Cabo San Lucas and San José del Cabo, both in the southern tip of the peninsula. A highway known as the Corridor links the two towns. Other attractions include deep sea fishing, golf, tennis, motorcycling, scuba diving and snorkeling, with windsurfing at Medano Beach and surfing at Todos Santos, Pescadero East Cape and Scorpion Bay.

Other important activities include fishing and fish farming, alternative energy production, mineral and salt extraction, film production, information and communication technologies, and biotechnology. Local fruits include dates, green papaya in syrup, along with guavas and pitahaya. Santa Rosalia is known for its production of breads.

Transportation

As of 2011, the state has 5,651 km of highway, eleven ports (five of which are international), and four international airports.

The peninsula's main transport artery is Mexican Federal Highway 1, which runs from the southern end of the peninsula at Cabo San Lucas to the United States-Mexico border at San Ysidro.

Mexican Federal Highway 19 provides an alternate route between Cabo San Lucas and La Paz.

A toll road, Mexican Federal Highway 1D, provides an alternate route from Los Cabos International Airport to Cabo San Lucas.

There are also ferries from the east coast of the peninsula to the mainland, with most going to Mazatlán in the state of Sinaloa. This trip takes about thirteen hours. The state's main airports are Los Cabos International Airport and Manuel Márquez de León International Airport.

Media
Newspapers of Baja California Sur include: El Peninsular, El Periódico, El Sudcaliforniano , and Tribuna de los Cabos.

Culture

Three of the indigenous cultures remain, the Cochimí, the Guaycura and the Pericú. Traditional music is usually played by trios playing an accordion and two guitars in bands called "cochi", in styles such as corridos, waltzes, polkas and mazurkas along with norteño. Traditional dress for women includes a semicircular red skirt decorated with local flora, along with a flowered blouse. This is most often seen at festivals where traditional dances such as Las Pitahayas, El Conejo, El Apasionado, El Chaverán, La Yuca, La Cuera, Las Calabazas and El Tupé are performed.
Because of the long coastline, much of the state's cuisine is based on seafood, including species not normally eaten in other parts of Mexico such as manta rays. Oregano and a local herb called damiana are common seasonings. The latter is also used as a flavoring for a local liquor. Traditional dishes include breaded and fried clams, machaca and generally accompanied by flour tortillas.

See also
El Boleo
Pascual Ortiz Rubio

References

External links

www.AllAboutBaja.com All about Baja California Sur and the Baja peninsula.
Baja California Sur: Cabo Pulmo Coral Reef in Danger
Interamerican Association for Environmental Defense
 Baja California Sur State Government
 Enciclopedia de los Municipios de México Entry on Baja California Sur

 
States of Mexico
States and territories established in 1974
1974 establishments in Mexico